Wall Street is an American pre-Code drama film directed by Roy William Neill and starring Ralph Ince, Aileen Pringle, Sam De Grasse, Philip Strange, and Freddie Burke Frederick. Released on December 1, 1929, it was produced by Harry Cohn.

Premise 
Ralph Ince is Roller McCray, a steelworker turned ruthless tycoon whose tough business methods leads a rival (Philip Strange) to commit suicide. The widow (Aileen Pringle), believing she can ruin Ince by using his own methods, conspires with her husband's former partner (Sam De Grasse), but a strong friendship between Ince and Pringle's young son (Freddie Burke Frederick) changes things dramatically.

Cast
Ralph Ince - Roller McCray
Aileen Pringle - Ann Tabor
Philip Strange - Walter Tabor
Sam De Grasse - John Willard
Ernest Hilliard - Savage
James Finlayson - Andy
George MacFarlane - Ed Foster
Fred Graham - Baring

See also
1929 in film

External links
 
 

1929 films
1920s business films
1929 drama films
American black-and-white films
American business films
Columbia Pictures films
1920s English-language films
Films directed by Roy William Neill
Films set in New York City
Wall Street films
1920s American films